Islam in the Indian Ocean was established by Muslim sea merchants well before the European discovery of Seychelles. However, unlike in other island states including the Comoros and Maldives, there were no permanent inhabitants in Seychelles until the French settlement in 1770. Today, the Muslim population of the islands is reported to be only 1.1%, roughly 900 people. Many of its island neighbors in the southern Indian Ocean, including Comoros, the Maldives and Zanzibar, have a much larger Muslim influence because of their settlement by Muslims, before European colonization. Mauritius also has a much higher Muslim population due to the importation of labour from British India on a scale not seen in Seychelles. The government of Seychelles allows 15 minutes of religious broadcasting every Friday for the Muslim community.

Background 
Approximately 1.6 percent of Seychelles is Islam, though many Islam mosques have been built around the country. One of the prominent islands with many of the Muslims and mosques is the island of Mahe.

Demographics 

According to the 2010 Census, there were 1,459 Muslims in the Seychelles constituting 1.6 % of the population of Seychelles. This is an increase of 593 from the 2002 census, which reported 866 Muslims constituting 1.1 % of the population. In 1994, there were 506 Muslims constituting 0.7 % of the country's population.

Islamic Society of Seychelles and fasting 
An Islamic Society of Seychelles (current president: Ibrahim Afif) attempted to start their own program named Explore Islam. However, the program was closed down unexpectedly.

On 5 June 2019, the Islamic community held an Eid-ul-Fitr celebration at Stad Popiler (which is located in the capital, Victoria).

Mosques
 Sheikh Mohamed bin Khalifa Mosque

References

External links
 US Government report in Religious Freedom in Seychelles

 
Seychelles
Religion in Seychelles